Teresa Wat (born 1949 or 1950) is a Canadian politician who was elected to the Legislative Assembly of British Columbia in the 2013 provincial election. She represents the electoral district of Richmond North Centre as a member of the British Columbia Liberal Party and was appointed Minister of International Trade, and Minister Responsible for the Asia Pacific Strategy and Multiculturalism on June 10, 2013, by Premier Christy Clark. While provincial minister of trade, Wat worked to court Huawei, China Poly Group, and other companies to invest in British Columbia.

Wat is the president and CEO of Mainstream Broadcasting Corporation CHMB AM1320 and has also served as the news director at Channel M Television (now OMNI BC), and previously served as a communications advisor at B.C.'s Cabinet Policy and Communications Secretariat. In 2010, Wat was appointed to the Canadian Women Voters Congress Advisory Board and was appointed one of B.C.'s top 100 most influential women by the Vancouver Sun. She is also currently a board member of the school of journalism at UBC.

Electoral record

See also
Wat (surname)

References

British Columbia Liberal Party MLAs
Women government ministers of Canada
Members of the Executive Council of British Columbia
Women MLAs in British Columbia
Living people
People from Richmond, British Columbia
Year of birth uncertain
21st-century Canadian politicians
21st-century Canadian women politicians
Canadian politicians of Chinese descent
Year of birth missing (living people)